Shanakht(English Translation: Identity) is a Pakistani television social drama series that debuted on Hum TV on 5 August 2014. It is written and directed by Amna Nawaz Khan and is produced by Momina Duraid. It is a A N K Production project. The show stars Maya Ali, Fahad Mirza and Noor Hassan Rizvi in pivotal roles. The show aired Tuesdays at 8:00 pm.

The drama serial premiered on 5 August 2014 in Pakistan, with the prime slot of 8:00 pm every Friday on the channel Hum TV, the serial aired its final episode on 16 December 2014, and was extremely praised. The final episode of serial left an unforgettable effect on audience. Shanakht received widespread critical acclaim and is widely regarded to be one of the greatest television series of all time. Due to the Islamic serial trend and minimum cult philosophy cliche dialogues, the serial was a major hit and was praised heavily. It is also among the top series of Pakistan.

Plot

Shanakht mainly deals with the subject of social life in upper-class Pakistan. The story revolves around a young girl named Qurratulain (nicknamed Annie), a devout and practising Muslim. She is shown to often cover her head using a Hijaab as prescribed by her faith. She usually faces strong criticism and objections from her family members over her obsession about being a dutiful Muslim, especially from her liberal-thinking mother. As time progresses, Annie begins to develop feelings for her first cousin Hashim (Noor Hassan).  Hashim, though fond of Annie, resents her for religious, and hence out-dated, outlook on life. In a twisted turn of events Hashim sends a wedding proposal for Kashaf, Annie's younger sister, rather than Annie who has always been deemed more compatible with him. Kahshaf outright rejects the proposal. With a broken heart Hashim leaves for England for higher studies where he befriends Rohaan (Fahad Mirza). Rohaan has a pleasant, fun loving personality, but despite this he also believes in adhering to religious teachings in life. Rohaan's friendship gradually changes Hashim, his attitude towards life and religion.

Cast

 Maya Ali as Qurratulain (Annie)
 Noor Hassan Rizvi as Hashim 
 Fahad Mirza as Rohaan
 Muneeb Butt as Haris
 Kanza Wayne as Faryal
 Shamim Hilaly as Shareen 
 Azra Mohyeddin as Rohaan's mother
 Shehryar Zaidi as Rohaan's father
 Sabahat Ali Bukhari as Huma 
 Hina Javed As Kashaf
 Fariya Hassan As Ayesha 
 Mariam Ansari as Zubia
 Bilal Awan

Summary

Episodes 1–6

Shanakht is a story of a girl Qurratulain or Annie (Maya Ali) who hails from a modern/liberal family. Things take a new turn, when Annie starts covering her head with head scarf commonly known as hijab. Annie faces opposition from her family over this decision, but she is firm on it. Like a typical young girl, Annie has feelings for her first cousin Hashim (Noor Hassan).  Hashim (Noor Hassan) also likes her to be his life partner but is also allergic to new ideas and way of life of Ainne to an extent that he proposes Annie's sister Kashaf instead of Annie, but Kashaf rejects the proposal (as she is in love with her friend Haris). With a broken heart Hashim leaves for England for higher studies where he befriends Rohaan (Fahad Mirza). Rohaan has a pleasant, fun loving personality, but despite this he also believes in adhering to religious teachings in life. Rohaan's parents are friends with Hashim and Annie's parents, Hashim and Rohaan are unaware of this. Because of the marriage refuse there are also distances between Hashim and Kashaf's family, Annie breaks these distances and makes everyone live happily together. Rohaan's Family has fixed his marriage date with a girl named Esha but they are unaware of his new look, when Rohaan comes back to Pakistan everyone is shocked to see him.

Annie's mother is fed-up of her hijaab and wants her to get rid of it immediately, she is angry at Annie that no one is marrying Annie because of her new look and want her sister Kashaf for the marriage who is again refusing, it is shown that her mother blames her friend Ayesha(who is also Islamic) for her hijaab and forces her to stay away from Aysha, she is also forcing her to stop wearing hijaab which is also disturbing Annie. A new proposal comes and in order to appear in front of them Huma(Ainny's mother) tells her not to wear hijaab and also tells her that she can do what she wants after the marriage and now she has to listen to her, Annie does so and the proposal is accepted and marriage date is fixed leaving Annie sad and crying that she has disturbed her identity just for a proposal.

Episode 7-8(Climax)

Annie is disturbed with her fiancée's disturbing personality and she is disliking the fact that he wants her to go out on a date with him, Annie tells Kashaf about this and she tells her that she should be going out on a dinner with him because of which their understanding would grow, Annie agrees. The next day Annie goes to a restaurant with her fiancée on a dinner where he invites his friend, the episode focuses on the fact that he has a bad character, seeing this Ainne leaves to stop her he holds her hand and tells her that she has to stay and should listen to him, Ainne slaps him and shows him his limit after this she finishes her engagement. When she reaches home she tells everyone that she has done the right thing. After this she tells Huma that there is a charming man whom Ainne is waiting for and tells her that he would soon entire her life upon Allah's choice Huma smiles and agrees. The next morning Ainne asks her father Ajmat that she wants to join her office and through this she can prove that Hijaab is not a painful thing for women Ajmat smiles and agrees. Kashaf tells every one about Haris and gets engaged with him leaving Ajmat and Huma really happy for both their daughters

The next day in office Ainne is working and she meets Rohaan. Rohaan gets so impressed with her personality and asks her parents to take marriage proposal, her mother and sister are not happy with this decision. The other day Ainne and Rohaan's engagement takes place and it is decided that their marriage would take place in a mosque, this decision disturbs Huma, Kashaf and as well as Rohan's Mother and his sister Bina and Zubia.

The next episode starts with Rohan, his father and Amjat. They are making arrangements for the marriage, Rohan and Ainnie's Nikkah takes place and after the marriage everyone except their fathers are shown angry with the marriage.  After the marriage when Ainnie goes to her room, her mother-in-law tells her that she always hated her and this marriage was only due to Rohaans decision and that now she has to live according to her decision this hurts Ainnie.

The next day she tells Ainnie to their take off her Hijaab in order to go to a dinner in which they were invited or their she should stay home for this Ainnie refuses to go. Haris is asking Kashaf for so many things which is disturbing Amjat.

Episode 9-13

Bina and Zubia (Rohaan's Sisters) are also the ones unhappy for the marriage, Zubia gets engaged with Hammad and it is shown that on a party she starts to dance and her video gets leaked on internet she gets very upset and scared, Annie Asks her to share her problem and while telling her Annie takes them both to her friend Ayesha's Home, Ayesha's brother helps them to pull off the video from internet and the video gets deleted. Zubia and Bina gets impressed with Annie's personality and starts to like her their mom however is accepting Annie. Kashaf and Haris are married and Annie and Rohaan invites them to a dinner in restaurant where Rohaan and Haris have little argument which further changes it into an emotional fight. Rohaan tells his parents that he has to attend a convention for his course and asks Annie to work for his office. Upon meeting Hashim he tells him that he is married. Because of Annie's Work every one in the office gets impressed including her father-in-law. Bina tries to wear Hijab but her mother yells at her and tells her to stop it, Rohaan and Hashim land to Pakistan together and Annie finds out that they both are friends and it is also revealed that Hashim has married a girl named Faryal, his mother is shocked to learn this but she accepts them home. Haris Asks for Kashaf to get him a Flat but she denies and he slaps her for this, she is kicked out and she leaves instantly, she later regrets that she would have done what Annie did, a marriage proposal comes for Zubia and she gets nervous, Annie handles her and calms her down she feels so relief and hugs her, Rohaan's Mother is watching this and she gets impressed with Annie, Shereen(Hashim's Mom) is not happy with Faryal's habits and asks Hashim that why he choose her upon Annie. Haris's dad tells him that his company has faced a loss because of him and only Rohaan can handle this, Haris talks to Rohaan and Rohaan Agrees to help Haris is now Shocked with his personality. Rohaan's mom finally accepts Annie as her daughter-in-law and now Zubia gets married.

Episode 14-16 

Ainne is now living a very happy life as a wife, daughter-in-law, and as a worker due to her sweet nature she is loved by every one now. Hashim on other hand is tired of fighting between Faryal and his mother (Sheeren) he now is working with Rohaan and Ainne in their office. Haris now accepts his mistake and asks Kashaf to forgive him, Kashaf then asks Ainne and thanks her for being supportive.

These episode sequences sow that Hashim now is regretting about rejecting Ainne's proposal and wants Faryal to be a good daughter-in-law. He is feeling guilty for his bad deeds upon rejecting Ainne just because of her hijab.

Episode 17 

Hashim and his Mom are telling Faryal to live according to live decently and stop her indecent acts but she tells them that she is what she always will be, further more distances have arise between Shereen and Faryal.

Next day Faryal goes to Rohaan's office in anger and tells Hashim to leave, Rohaan is not present there and Ainne tells Faryal to have coffee and tells her to wait. Faryal yells, and tells her to be quiet. Hashim gets angry at Faryal and tells her to shut up. Faryal then asks Hashim, why he rejected Ainne, if he likes Ainne more than her(Faryal). Ainne gets hurt and cries remembering her past. she takes leave from office and spends her time in depression where as Hashim tells Faryal to apologize to Ainne or else he would leave her. And Faryal also starts wearing the clothes that her mother-in-law selects for her.

Episode 18 (Last episode)

Episode starts with showing Ainne who is still depressed, it shows that Hashim and Faryal are now getting divorced when Ainne hears this news she tries her best to help them. Rohaan gets to know about Ainne and Hashim unstated relationship and tells her that he trusts her he tells her to stop them she next morning goes there and tells Hashim that she is the luckiest girl who didn't marry him and tells him that if he want Faryal to change he must change himself Faryal is shown listening to them silently and she gets to know the truth. The Last scene shown Faryal apologizing to Ainne. Every thing is settled Kashaf and Haris are also settled and the story ends happily showing Ainne Pregnant.

Reception 

The series started off with higher ratings compared to other shows. Within its first five episodes it scored higher Trps, when it reached episode 8 i.e. when the Protagonists got married the series scored a hit in trp and reached to more than 6.3Trps on average. Upon reaching more episodes the series eventually grew in Trp ratings and got highest achievement on Hum TV it has received a large number of viewers and is currently among top 10 series of Pakistan. In UK, Asia and Pakistan, according to the leading supplier of online BARB ratings reports, ‘Shanakht,’ broadcast at 20:00, garnered 116,800 viewers peaking at 172,200 viewers. Critically, Zainab Waseem noted that the drama reinforced what she described as inaccurate stereotypes about Pakistani elite as being liberal and unreligious.

Inspiration
The drama is inspired by Haya from the most famous novel "Jannat Kay Pattay" written by Nemrah Ahmed.

Soundtrack 

Shanakht'si title song is sung by Midhat, composed by Shani Haider the OST was released after the pilot episode and was appreciated.

Accolades

References

External links
 Official Website
 
 Hum TV's official Youtube
 Hum TV's official Dailymotion
 Hum TV's official Video channel

Hum TV original programming
Pakistani drama television series
Urdu-language television shows
2014 Pakistani television series debuts